This Place Sucks Ass is an EP released by Canadian punk rock band PUP on October 23, 2020. It was released under two labels: Little Dipper (the band's personal label), and Rise Records.

Development 
This Place Sucks Ass contains mostly recordings from the studio sessions of the band's previous album, Morbid Stuff.

According to Pitchfork, "this place sucks ass" is a sentence the band used to say as a joke while touring, to describe the places where they played.

Reception 
The EP received generally favorable reviews. Pitchfork gave it a positive review, while Metacritic calculated an overall score of 76/100 one week after the EP's release.

UK rock music review website Kerrang! noted a lack of "vitality and vim" compared to Morbid Stuff.

The EP received a Juno Award nomination for Alternative Album of the Year at the Juno Awards of 2021.

Track listing 
All songs are written by PUP, except Grandaddy cover "A.M. 180".

Personnel
PUP
 Stefan Babcock – lead vocals, rhythm guitar
 Steve Sladkowski – lead guitar, backing vocals
 Nestor Chumak – bass guitar, backing vocals, engineering
 Zack Mykula – drums, percussion, backing vocals

Production
 David Schiffman – production, engineering, mixing
 Spencer Sunshine – engineering
 Darren McGill – engineering
 Michael Gnocato – engineering
 Harry Hess – mastering
 Brandon Lepine – artwork

Charts

References 

2020 EPs
PUP (band) albums
Rise Records EPs